Claudio Langes (born 4 August 1961) is a former racing driver from Italy.

In 1978 he won the Italian 125 cc go-kart championship. In subsequent years he competed in Formula 3 and in Formula 3000, where his best result was a second place at Pergusa-Enna, achieved in 1989 with a Lola Formula 3000.

Reaching Formula One in 1990, he failed to pre-qualify for all 14 of the grands prix that he entered with EuroBrun (still a record). Aside from Gary Brabham and Bruno Giacomelli in the Life entries, and at times Bertrand Gachot's Coloni, Langes was always the next slowest, often several seconds slower than his teammate Roberto Moreno before the cash-strapped team was closed. Langes later raced in touring cars.

Racing record

Complete International Formula 3000 results
(key) (Races in bold indicate pole position; races in italics indicate fastest lap.)

Complete Formula One results
(key) (Races in bold indicate pole position; races in italics indicate fastest lap)

References
Profile at F1 Rejects

Italian racing drivers
Italian Formula One drivers
EuroBrun Formula One drivers
1961 births
Living people
International Formula 3000 drivers
World Touring Car Championship drivers
24 Hours of Spa drivers